Antiviral drugs are different from antibiotics. Flu antiviral drugs are different than antiviral drugs used to treat other infectious diseases such as COVID-19. Antiviral drugs prescribed to treat COVID-19 are not approved or authorized to treat flu.

References

Antiviral
Antiviral drugs